The President of the Pamantasan ng Lungsod ng Maynila is the principal executive officer of the University of the City of Manila. The office was created by the Republic Act 4196, which is today's University Charter.

The President oversees the policy implementation, guide the institution towards the realization of its vision-mission, as well as monitor and administer the overall affairs of the PLM, including its three major functions - instruction, research and community extension services.

The members of the Board of Regents are tasked to elect from among themselves a university president who shall serve for a term of six years which is renewable 
for another term of six years.

Liturgy of the investiture of the President

After the election of the President, the Chairman of the Board of Regents is tasked to formally conduct a presidential investiture liturgy.

The investiture liturgy consists of formal features like the turnover of the mace of authority and power by the Chairman, and the presentation of the academic collar composed of linked gold coins stamped with the logo of the university. It also showcases the rich tradition and culture of the Filipinos through dance, music and colorful costumes.

The mace symbolizes the authority of the president, and it is the symbolic source of power of his executive acts and his administration; the academic collar signifies his vow to embrace the traditions and values of the academic community, while the medallion (with the golden seal of the PLM impressed on it) represents his commitment in the pursuit of truth as well as the burden of academic leadership inherent in his position.
 
Upon presentation of the academic collar, the Chairman is required to utter: "As you wear it, wear it with dignity and pride, like other presidents of the University before you."
 
The first investiture liturgy happened on February 10, 1968 when Mayor Antonio J. Villegas turned over the Mace of Authority and Power to Dr. Benito F. Reyes, the first President of the PLM.

List of presidents of the Pamantasan ng Lungsod ng Maynila

Notes

Pamantasan ng Lungsod ng Maynila